Saint-Bresson may refer to:

 Saint-Bresson, Gard, in the Gard department of France
 Saint-Bresson, Haute-Saône, in the Haute-Saône department of France